Francisco Cabasés (24 June 1916 – 5 May 2019) was an Argentine professional footballer who played for Talleres.

References

1916 births
2019 deaths
Argentine footballers
Talleres de Córdoba footballers
Argentine centenarians
Men centenarians
Deaths from pneumonia in Argentina
Association footballers not categorized by position
Footballers from Córdoba, Argentina